Francisco Savalls Massot (1817–1885) also known as Francesc Savalls i Massot, was a Spanish Catalan carlist. He was born in the Province of Girona. He fought in all three of the Carlist Wars on the side of the Carlists. After the defeat of Carlos, Duke of Madrid in 1876, he went into exile in France, where he died in Nice on 19 November 1885.

References

Further reading
 Narración militar de la guerra carlista de 1869 a 1876 (in Spanish). El cuerpo de estado mayor del ejército, 1887.

External links
 

1817 births
1886 deaths
People from Baix Empordà